Ray K. Metzker (September 10, 1931 – October 9, 2014) was an American photographer known chiefly for his bold, experimental B&W cityscapes and for his large "composites", assemblages of printed film strips and single frames. His work is held in various major public collections and is the subject of eight monographs. He received awards from the John Simon Guggenheim Memorial Foundation, National Endowment for the Arts and Royal Photographic Society.

Life and work
Metzker was born in Milwaukee and lived in Philadelphia from the 1960s until his death. He was married to the photographer Ruth Thorne-Thomsen.

He was a student of Harry Callahan and Aaron Siskind at the Institute of Design in Chicago. He taught for many years at the Philadelphia College of Art and also taught at the University of New Mexico.

After graduate studies at the Institute of Design in Chicago, Metzker travelled extensively throughout Europe in 1960-61, where he had two epiphanies:  that "light" would be his primary subject, and that he would seek synthesis and complexity over simplicity.  Metzker often said the artist begins his explorations by embracing what he doesn't know.

Metzker died on October 9, 2014.

Awards
1966: Guggenheim Fellowship, John Simon Guggenheim Memorial Foundation.
1975: National Endowment for the Arts Fellowship.
1988: National Endowment for the Arts Fellowship.
1989: Bernheim Fellowship at the Bernheim Arboretum and Research Forest, Clermont, Kentucky.
2000: Centenary Medal, Royal Photographic Society, Bath (HonFRPS).

Collections
Metzker's work is held in the following public collections:
Art Institute of Chicago.
Art Museum of West Virginia University, Morgantown.
Albertina Museum, Vienna.
Los Angeles County Museum of Art.
Museum of Fine Arts, Houston.
Museum of Modern Art, New York: 14 prints (as of 22 December 2021)
Nelson-Atkins Museum of Art, Kansas City.
J. Paul Getty Museum, Los Angeles.
Whitney Museum of American Art, New York: 14 prints (as of 15 December 2021)
Metropolitan Museum of Art, New York.
Philadelphia Museum of Art, Philadelphia
Addison Gallery of American Art, Andover, Mass.
Princeton University Art Museum, Princeton, NJ.
National Gallery of Australia, Canberra
Baltimore Museum of Art, Baltimore, Md.
Beloit College, Beloit, Wisconsin.
Bibliotheque Nationale, Paris
Center for Creative Photography, University of Arizona, Tucson.
Cleveland Museum of Art, Ohio
Davison Art Center, Middleton, Conn.
The Detroit Institute of Arts, Michigan.
Fogg Art Museum, Harvard Art Museums, Harvard University, Cambridge, Mass.
Fonds National d'Art Contemporain, Paris
High Museum of Art, Atlanta, Ga.
George Eastman Museum, Rochester, NY.
Speed Art Museum, Louisville, Ky.
Maison européenne de la photographie, Paris.
Musée de l'Élysée, Lausanne.
Milwaukee Art Museum, Milwaukee.
Chrysler Museum of Art, Norfolk, Va.
Museum of Fine Arts, Boston, Boston
National Gallery of Art, Washington, D.C.
National Gallery of Canada, Ottawa.
Smithsonian American Art Museum, Washington, D.C.
Tokyo Metropolitan Museum of Photography, Japan.
Sheldon Memorial Art Gallery, Lincoln, Nebraska.
Saint Louis Art Museum, St. Louis, Mo.
Toledo Museum of Art, Toledo, Ohio.
Worcester Art Museum, Worcester, Mass.

References

American photographers
1931 births
2014 deaths
Illinois Institute of Technology alumni
Beloit College alumni